Huberts is a Dutch patronymic surname. Among variant forms are Hubers, Hubert, Huibers, Huiberts, and Huijberts. Notable people with the surname include:

Dirk Hubers (1913–2003), Dutch ceramist active in Belgium
Jan Huberts (born 1937), Dutch motorcycle racer
Shaun Huberts (born 1981), Canadian musician
Terry Huberts (born 1946), Canadian (British Columbian) politician
Trees Huberts (1934–2013), Dutch CDA politician
Wilhelm Huberts (born 1938), Austrian football midfielder and manager

See also
Timo Hübers (born 1996), German football defender

References

Dutch-language surnames
Patronymic surnames

de:Huberts